Baldassare "Barney" Ales (May 13, 1934 – April 17, 2020) was an American music industry executive best known as a leading figure and sometime company president at Motown Records.  He is credited with successfully promoting the black-owned company in the wider white-dominated music industry in the US.

Biography
Barney Ales was born in Detroit, the son of Sicilian-born barber Silvestro Ales and his wife Evelyn.   He attended Thomas M. Cooley High School, and after leaving worked on a Dodge auto assembly line.  In the mid-1950s he took his first job in the music industry, in the local office of Capitol Records, where he worked in sales and promotion.  He developed contacts in the city's record stores and radio stations, and moved to Warner Bros. Records in 1959 as the company's Detroit branch manager.
  
In 1960 Ales met Berry Gordy Jr., who soon hired him as the national sales and promotion manager for his new Motown company.   He built a team to promote Motown's records and ensure their effective distribution across national and international markets.  He later said: "It was a well-thought-out philosophy that we had...   Motown was a music company. It wasn’t an R&B company. It wasn’t a soul company. It was the same as Capitol Records or CBS: a company devoted to making music."  According to Motown chronicler Adam White: "There’s no question that Ales's race gave him access to, and influence with, pop radio DJs and programmers...  That was the reality of the times."

Ales was also credited as a co-writer on some Motown songs, including the hits "Once Upon a Time" and "What's the Matter with You Baby", recorded by Marvin Gaye and Mary Wells. 

When Gordy moved Motown's headquarters to Los Angeles in 1972, Ales left the company and stayed in Detroit.  He set up his own record label, Prodigal, but it was not successful and he rejoined Motown in 1975, becoming the company's executive vice-president and then president.  In 1979 he left Motown again, and in later years worked with other companies including Elton John's Rocket label, Bob Guccione's Penthouse label, Norman Granz's Pablo Records, and George Clinton's company AEM.

Ales died in 2020, aged 85.

References

1934 births
2020 deaths
Motown
American music industry executives
American people of Italian descent